The Hyland Bay and Moyle Floodplain comprises the floodplain of the lower reaches of the Moyle and Little Moyle Rivers, and the adjoining mudflats of Hyland Bay, on the west coast of the Top End of the Northern Territory of Australia. It is an important site for waterbirds.

Birds
The site has been identified as a  Important Bird Area (IBA) by BirdLife International because the floodplain supports up to 500,000 magpie geese and over 1% of the world population of pied herons.  The intertidal mudflats of the bay support large numbers of waders, or shorebirds, especially great knots.  Other waterbirds recorded breeding in the area in relatively large numbers include egrets, little pied cormorants, nankeen night herons and royal spoonbills.

References

Important Bird Areas of the Northern Territory
Bays of the Northern Territory
Rivers of the Northern Territory
Wetlands of the Northern Territory
Floodplains of Australia